Wien Modern is a modern music festival in Vienna, Austria that was founded by Claudio Abbado in 1988. It was created with the intent of revitalizing the traditional music scene of Vienna. Friedrich Cerha, Johannes Maria Staud, Mark Andre, Wolfgang Mitterer, Olga Neuwirth, Peter Eötvös, and Georg Friedrich Haas have been featured at the festival since its inception.

Footnotes

References
 
 

Music festivals established in 1988
Music festivals in Austria
Electroacoustic music festivals
Electronic music festivals in Austria
Contemporary classical music festivals
Festivals in Vienna